The Somerset County League is a football competition based in England. The Premier Division sits at step 7 (or level 11) of the National League System. It is a feeder to the Western League Division One and has promoted a club in seven of the last ten seasons – Hengrove Athletic, Portishead, Radstock Town, Oldland Abbotonians, Wells City, Cheddar, Ashton & Backwell United and Nailsea & Tickenham.

Presently, the league has four divisions. It is fed by the Bath and North Somerset District League, the Mid-Somerset League, the Perry Street and District League, the Taunton & District Saturday League, the Yeovil and District League, and the Weston-super-Mare and District League. It is affiliated to the Somerset County FA which was formed in 1885.

History

The Somerset County League, also known as the Somerset Senior League, was founded in 1890.

Six of the current teams in the Somerset County League have competed at a higher level, namely:
Chard Town
Clevedon United
Glastonbury
Ilminster Town
Minehead
Peasedown Miners Welfare

Among the clubs that have left the Somerset County League and now compete at a higher level are:

Ashton & Backwell United
Bishops Lydeard
Bishop Sutton
Brislington
Bridgwater Town
Bristol Manor Farm
Cheddar
Hengrove Athletic
Keynsham Town
Larkhall Athletic
Nailsea & Tickenham
Odd Down
Oldland Abbotonians
Paulton Rovers
Portishead Town
Radstock Town
Shepton Mallet
Street
Taunton Town
Wellington
Wells City
Yeovil Town

Clandown had three periods in the Western Football League but rejoined the Somerset County League in 1992 before folding in 2004.  Westland-Yeovil eventually folded after leaving the County League for the Western League but they subsequently reformed as Westland Sports and now compete in the Dorset Premier League.

2022–23 Members

Premier Division
Chard Town
Chilcompton Sports
Clevedon United
Clutton 
Fry Club
Ilminster Town
Keynsham Town Reserves
Mendip Broadwalk 
Middlezoy Rovers
Nailsea United
Stockwood Green
Stockwood Wanderers
Timsbury Athletic
Watchet Town
Wells City Reserves
Worle

Division One 
Ashton & Backwell United Reserves
Burnham United
Castle Cary
Middlezoy Rovers Reserves
Minehead
Nailsea & Tickenham Reserves
Saltford 
Somerton Town 
Staplegrove 
Street Reserves
Uphill Castle
Welton Rovers Reserves
Westfield
Winscombe
Wrington Redhill 
Yatton & Cleeve United

Division Two
AFC Brislington
Ashcott  
Banwell
Bishops Lydeard Reserves
Cam Valley 
Cheddar Reserves
Chew Magna 
Combe St. Nicholas 
Cutters Friday
Glastonbury
Hutton 
Imperial
Long Ashton
Peasedown Miners Welfare
Portishead Town Reserves

Division Three  
Bishop Sutton Reserves 
Burnham United Reserves 
Clevedon United Reserves 
Congresbury
Draycott 
Fry Club Reserves 
Nailsea United Reserves
Radstock Town Reserves
Somerton Town Reserves 
St George Easton In Gordano 
Tunley Athletic
Winscombe Reserves
Worle Rangers 
Yatton & Cleeve United Reserves

Premier Division Champions

References

External links
Full Time

 
Football in Somerset
Football leagues in England
Sports leagues established in 1890
1890 establishments in England